The Bureau of Democracy, Human Rights and Labor Affairs (DRL) is a bureau within the United States Department of State. The bureau is under the purview of the Under Secretary of State for Civilian Security, Democracy, and Human Rights.

DRL's responsibilities include promoting democracy around the world, formulating U.S. human rights policies, and coordinating policy in human rights-related labor issues.  The Office to Monitor and Combat Anti-Semitism is a separate agency included in the Bureau. 

The Bureau is responsible for producing annual reports on the countries of the world with regard to religious freedom through its Office of International Religious Freedom and human rights. It also administers the U.S. Human Rights and Democracy Fund (HRDF), which is DRL's flagship program.

The head of the Bureau is the Assistant Secretary of State for Democracy, Human Rights, and Labor, and the official currently acting in this capacity is Uzra Zeya. 

The bureau was formerly known as the Bureau of Human Rights and Humanitarian Affairs, but was reorganized and renamed in 1994, to reflect both a broader sweep and a more focused approach to the interlocking issues of human rights, worker rights, and democracy.

Examples of DRL's human rights advocacy in foreign locations include China, the Middle East, and Russia.

From 2011 to 2015, DRL provided financial support to the Tor network (The Onion Router).

Organization
The Bureau of Democracy, Human Rights, and Labor is divided into twelve offices.
Office of Country Reports and Asylum Affairs – Prepares the State Department's annual reports, including the Country Reports on Human Rights
Office of International Religious Freedom – Supports the United States Ambassador-at-Large for International Religious Freedom
Office of Policy Planning and Public Diplomacy
Office for Africa – Monitors human rights in Africa
Office for East Asia and the Pacific – Monitors human rights in East Asia
Office for Near East Asia – Monitors human rights in the Middle East
Office for Western Hemisphere – Monitors human rights in Latin America
Office for South Central Asia – Monitors human rights in Central Asia
Office of Global Programming
Office of Multilateral and Global Affairs – Formulates and implements U.S. government policy on human rights in multilateral organizations, including the UN Human Rights Council, the UN General Assembly, the UN Security Council, the Office of the High Commissioner for Human Rights, the European Union, the Organization of American States, the African Union, and the Association of Southeast Asian Nations
Office of International Labor Rights – Advises on policies and initiatives in tandem with the International Labour Organization
Executive Office

References

External links
Bureau of Democracy, Human Rights, and Labor official website
HumanRights.gov
Official page on Facebook
Bureau of Democracy, Human Rights and Labor on AllGov.com

United States labor law
DRL
Human rights organizations based in the United States
Government agencies established in 1977